Kiwaukee Sanchez Thomas [kee-WA-kee] (born June 19, 1977 in Warner Robins, Georgia) is a retired American National Football League (NFL) and Canadian Football League (CFL) cornerback who is currently the Head Football Coach at Middle Georgia State University. He played college football at Georgia Southern and was drafted by the Jacksonville Jaguars in the fifth round of the 2000 NFL Draft.

Thomas has also been a member of the Miami Dolphins, Buffalo Bills, Detroit Lions and Montreal Alouettes.

References

1977 births
Living people
People from Warner Robins, Georgia
Players of American football from Georgia (U.S. state)
American football cornerbacks
Canadian football defensive backs
American players of Canadian football
Georgia Southern Eagles football players
Jacksonville Jaguars players
Miami Dolphins players
Buffalo Bills players
Detroit Lions players
Montreal Alouettes players